James Stuart, 8th Earl of Moray KT (1708 – 5 July 1767) was the son of Francis Stuart, 7th Earl of Moray.

In 1741, he was elected as one of the 16 Scottish Representative peers who sat in the post-1707 British House of Lords, a position he retained until his death.

Life

James Stuart was born in 1708

In 1734, James married Grace Lockhart (1706–1738), granddaughter of the 9th Earl of Eglington and widow of 3rd Earl of Aboyne. Before her death in 1738, they had two children, Francis, (1737–1810), who succeeded as Earl of Moray, and Euphemia (1738–1771). He married again in 1740, this time to Margaret Wemyss, eldest daughter of the Earl of Wemyss; they had two sons, Lt-Colonel James Stuart (1741–1809),  and Lieutenant (RN) David Stuart (1745–1784).

In 1755 he purchased Balmerino House in Leith from the Crown who had confiscated the house due to Lord Balmerino's active support of the Jacobite Rebellion.

Footnotes

References

Sources
 

Earls of Moray
Knights of the Thistle
1708 births
1767 deaths
Scottish representative peers
Scottish Freemasons
People from Moray